Strype may refer to:

John Strype (1643–1737), English clergyman, historian and biographer
Strype, Netherlands, village in the municipality of Westvoorne, the Netherlands
The Strypes, Irish rock band